Agrostis gigantea, known by its common names black bent and redtop, is a perennial grass of the Agrostis genus.

It is native to Europe, but in the cooler areas of North America was widely used as a pasture grass until the 1940s. Although it has largely been replaced by soybeans and more palatable grasses, it still gets some use in poor soils. It was one of the grasses planted in areas disturbed by the Trans-Alaska Pipeline. It generally does well in response to fires, due to survival of rhizomes and seeds.

It can be found in open woodland, rough grassland, hedgerows, roadsides and waste ground, and as a weed on arable land.

This species is similar to Agrostis stolonifera, with the key difference being that the latter has stolons.  In fact the two are sometimes treated as a single species, and it is not always clear precisely what an author means by  Agrostis alba or Agrostis stolonifera.

Many internet sources describe Agrostis capillaris as being the tallest of the bent species. Marjorie Blamey, Richard and Alastair Fitter also describe black bent as being taller.

Description
The leaves are dull green.

The panicle is open and loose, of green or purplish colour. It flowers from June to August.

The leaves are rolled in shoot, not hairy, no auricles, but the plant has rhizomes.

References

External links

 

gigantea
Flora of Europe